Saša Čađo (born July 13, 1989) is a Serbian professional women's basketball player who plays for İstanbul Üniversitesi SK of the Turkish League. She also represents the Serbian national basketball team.

International career
She represented Serbian national basketball team at the EuroBasket 2015 in Budapest where they won the gold medal, and qualified for the 2016 Olympics, first in the history for the Serbian team.

Orders
 Medal of Merit to the People (Republika Srpska)

References

External links
Saša Čađo at eurobasket.com
Saša Čađo at eurobasketwomen2013.com
Saša Čađo at fiba.com

1989 births
Living people
Basketball players from Sarajevo
Serbs of Bosnia and Herzegovina
Bosnia and Herzegovina expatriate basketball people in Serbia
Shooting guards
Serbian women's basketball players
ŽKK Vršac players
ŽKK Partizan players
ŽKK Željezničar Sarajevo players
Basketball players at the 2016 Summer Olympics
Olympic basketball players of Serbia
Olympic bronze medalists for Serbia
Serbian expatriate basketball people in Bosnia and Herzegovina
Serbian expatriate basketball people in Romania
Serbian expatriate basketball people in Turkey
Medalists at the 2016 Summer Olympics
Olympic medalists in basketball
European champions for Serbia
Basketball players at the 2020 Summer Olympics